Haumea may refer to:

Haumea (mythology), a goddess of fertility and childbirth in Hawaiian mythology
Haumea (dwarf planet), a dwarf planet in the Kuiper belt
Haumea (bivalve), a genus of bivalves in the family Pectinidae